Sean Clarkson (born 1969) is a New Zealand sailor who has sailed at the Summer Olympics and in multiple Whitbread Round the World Races and America's Cups.

Clarkson grew up in Kerikeri and attended the University of Auckland for marine biology. He left university to join New Zealand Challenge and was a grinder on board NZL 20 during the 1992 Louis Vuitton Cup. He then sailed in the 1993–94 Whitbread Round the World Race on NZ Endeavour, which won the race, before joining Tag Heuer Challenge for the 1995 Louis Vuitton Cup.

He represented New Zealand at the 1996 Summer Olympics, sailing in a Soling with Kelvin Harrap and Jamie Gale. They finished 14th in the competition.

He competed in the 1997–98 Whitbread Round the World Race on Toshiba.

He then joined AmericaOne for the 2000 Louis Vuitton Cup. He was a member of Team SEB for the 2001–02 Volvo Ocean Race. He then competed in the 2003 Louis Vuitton Cup with Prada Challenge, and the 2007 Louis Vuitton Cup with BMW Oracle Racing.

He sailed with Artemis Racing in the 2011 Extreme Sailing Series, the 2011–13 America's Cup World Series and the 2013 Louis Vuitton Cup.

He has also won the TP52 World Championship with Team Nika and is a two-time winner of the Sydney to Hobart Yacht Race.

References

1969 births
Living people
New Zealand male sailors (sport)
University of Auckland alumni
People from Kerikeri
1992 America's Cup sailors
Volvo Ocean Race sailors
1995 America's Cup sailors
2000 America's Cup sailors
2003 America's Cup sailors
Luna Rossa Challenge sailors
2007 America's Cup sailors
Oracle Racing sailors
Artemis Racing sailors
2013 America's Cup sailors
Extreme Sailing Series sailors
Olympic sailors of New Zealand
Sailors at the 1996 Summer Olympics – Soling
2021 America's Cup sailors
American Magic